James Boag II (1854–1919) was the son of James Boag I, and co-proprietor of J. Boag & Sons, owner of the Boag's Brewery in Launceston, Tasmania, Australia.

Educated in Launceston, James Boag II was an energetic entrepreneur. A keen sportsman throughout his youth, Boag generously supported sporting clubs all his life.

Boag performed his military service in Launceston and qualified for the Long Service Medal in 1910. During the 1901 Federation celebrations, The Examiner reported that at midnight, "twenty-one guns boomed out the royal salute from the Launceston Artillery under Captain J. Boag".

James Boag II became manager of J. Boag & Son in 1887 and later became the sole proprietor after the death of his father in 1890.

In 1919, James II died and was succeeded by James III. The Daily Telegraph reported, A wide circle of friends will regret to learn of the death of Mr James Boag. He was a man keenly interested, though not perhaps altogether publicly, in the welfare of the city, and devoted much time to the development of sport.

A widow, five sons and four daughters are left to mourn the loss of a devoted husband and father.

References

1854 births
1919 deaths
Australian people of Scottish descent
People from Launceston, Tasmania
Australian brewers
19th-century Australian businesspeople
20th-century Australian businesspeople